Fort Saganne is a 1984 French war film directed by Alain Corneau and starring Gérard Depardieu, Philippe Noiret, Catherine Deneuve, and Sophie Marceau. Based on the 1980 novel of the same name by Louis Gardel, the film is about a soldier of humble beginnings who volunteers for service in the Sahara in 1911. After falling in love with the beautiful young daughter of the regional administrator, he is ordered to go on missions in the desert, where he engages in several successful campaigns and experiences severe loneliness. Later, while on a diplomatic mission to Paris, he has a brief affair with a journalist. Returning to Africa, he leads a gallant defense against a feared sultan and is awarded the Grand Cross of the Legion of Honour. He returns to his home a national hero and marries the young girl he has not forgotten, but their happiness is interrupted by the onset of World War I.

Fort Saganne was screened out of competition at the 1984 Cannes Film Festival. At the time of its production, Fort Saganne was France's biggest-budget film. The film earned 2,157,767 admissions in France. In 1985, the film was nominated for four César Awards, for Best Actor (Gérard Depardieu), Best Cinematography (Bruno Nuytten), Best Costume Design (Corinne Jorry, Rosine Delamare), and Best Sound.

Plot
In 1911, a willful and determined man from peasant stock named Charles Saganne (Gérard Depardieu) enlists in the military and is assigned to the Sahara Desert under the aristocratic Colonel Dubreuilh (Philippe Noiret). Saganne attracts the attentions of Madeleine (Sophie Marceau), the daughter of the regional administrator. In the Sahara, Saganne earns the respect of the Arabs, including Amajan, an independent warrior. After several campaigns, Saganne travels to Paris on a diplomatic mission. After having an affair with a journalist in Paris, Saganne returns to Africa, where he leads a valliant defense against Sultan Omar. He is awarded the Grand Cross of the Legion of Honour, and marries Madeleine. The onset of World War I puts his success and happiness at risk.

Cast
 Gérard Depardieu as Charles Saganne
 Philippe Noiret as Dubreuilh
 Catherine Deneuve as Louise
 Sophie Marceau as Madeleine of Saint-Ilette
 Michel Duchaussoy as Baculard
 Roger Dumas as Vulpi
 Jean-Louis Richard as Flammarin
 Jean-Laurent Cochet as Bertozza
 Pierre Tornade as Charles' Father
 Saïd Amadis as Amajar
 René Clermont as Monsieur de Saint-Ilette
 Hippolyte Girardot as Courette
 Sophie Grimaldi as Lady of Saint-Ilette
 Florent Pagny as Lucien

Production
For Saganne was filmed on location at Abbaye du Moncel, Pontpoint, Oise, France, and Mauritania where the eponymous fort was built near the Amojjar Pass close to Atar.

Reception

Box office
At the time of its production, Fort Saganne was France's biggest-budget film. The film earned 2,157,767 admissions in France.

Critical response
At the time of its theatrical release, the film received mixed reviews. In Variety magazine, the reviewer observed that the film "is often fine in its large-scale reconstruction of a time and place and a mentality, but falters in its attempts to inscribe well-detailed characters in its wide-screen canvas." The reviewer also found the romantic relationships depicted in the film to be underdeveloped.

In her review in Allmovie, Eleanor Mannikka gave the film three out of fivstars, noting that the "sweep of this epic skims over the qualities that transformed Saganne from an ordinary officer to a great military leader." Mannikka concluded:

Awards and nominations
 1985 César Award Nomination for Best Actor (Gérard Depardieu)
 1985 César Award Nomination for Best Cinematography (Bruno Nuytten)
 1985 César Award Nomination for Best Costume Design (Corinne Jorry, Rosine Delamare)
 1985 César Award Nomination for Best Sound (Jean-Paul Loublier, Claude Villand, Pierre Gamet).

References

External links
 
 
 

1984 films
1980s French-language films
Films directed by Alain Corneau
Films set in 1911
French war films
French epic films
War epic films
World War I films set in Africa
Films set in deserts
Films set in the French colonial empire
Films shot in Mauritania
Films scored by Philippe Sarde
Films set in Mauritania
1980s war films
Films set in the Sahara
1980s French films